Vronti is a village and a community of the Voio municipality. Before the 2011 local government reform it was part of the municipality of Tsotyli, of which it was a municipal district. The 2011 census recorded 123 inhabitants in the village and 178 inhabitants in the community of Vronti.

Administrative division
The community of Vronti consists of three separate settlements: 
Apidia (population 33)
Lefkadia (population 22)
Vronti (population 123)
The aforementioned population figures are as of 2011.

See also
List of settlements in the Kozani regional unit

References

Populated places in Kozani (regional unit)